Fritz Julius Kuhn (May 15, 1896 – December 14, 1951) was a German National Socialist activist who served as elected leader of the German American Bund before World War II. He became a naturalized United States citizen in 1934, but his citizenship was cancelled in 1943 owing to his status as a foreign agent of the National Socialist government, and he was deported in 1945.

Early life
Kuhn was born in Munich, Germany, on May 15, 1896, the son of Georg Kuhn and Julia Justyna Beuth. During World War I, Kuhn earned an Iron Cross as a German infantry lieutenant. After the war, he graduated from the Technical University of Munich with a master's degree in chemical engineering. In the 1920s, Kuhn moved to Mexico. In 1928, he moved to the United States and, in 1934, he became a naturalized citizen of the United States. He worked at a Ford factory in Detroit before assuming control of the Bund in Buffalo, New York, in 1936.

Leadership of the German American Bund 
A Congressional committee headed by Samuel Dickstein concluded that the Friends of New Germany supported a branch of German dictator Adolf Hitler's National Socialist  Party in the United States, and the Friends of New Germany disbanded. However, in March 1936, the German American Bund was established in Buffalo as a follow-up organization. The Bund elected the German-born American citizen Kuhn as its leader.

Kuhn, while describing the Bund as "sympathetic to the Hitler government", denied that the organization received money or took orders from the government of Germany. Kuhn also denied that the Bund had any agenda of introducing fascism to the United States.

Kuhn enlisted thousands of Americans by using antisemitic, anticommunist, pro-German, and pro-American propaganda. One of his first tasks was to plan a trip to Germany with 50 of his American followers. The purpose was to be in the presence of Hitler and to personally witness Nazism in practice.

At this time, Germany was preparing to host the 1936 Olympics. Kuhn anticipated a warm welcome from Adolf Hitler, but the encounter was a disappointment. This did not stop Kuhn from fabricating propaganda to his followers once he returned to the United States about how Hitler acknowledged him as the "American Führer".

As his profile grew, so did the tension against him. Not only Jewish-Americans, but also German-Americans who did not want to be associated with Nazis, protested against the Bund. These protests were occasionally violent, making the Bund front page news in the United States. In response to the outrage of Jewish war veterans, Congress in 1938 passed the Foreign Agents Registration Act requiring foreign agents to register with the State Department. The negative attention to the American National Socialists was not to Hitler's liking because he wanted the National Socialist Party in the United States to be strong, but stealthy. Hitler needed to keep the U.S. neutral throughout the coming war and sought to avoid provoking Americans, whereas Kuhn was eager to stir media attention. On March 1, 1938, the National Socialist government decreed that no German national could be a member of the Bund and that no National Socialist emblems were to be used by the organization.

Undaunted, on February 20, 1939, Kuhn held the largest and most publicized rally in the Bund's history at Madison Square Garden in New York City. Some 20,000 people attended and heard Kuhn mock President Franklin D. Roosevelt as "Frank D. Rosenfeld", calling his New Deal the "Jew Deal" and denouncing what he called Bolshevik-Jewish American leadership. Kuhn also stated: "The Bund is fighting shoulder to shoulder with patriotic Americans to protect America from a race that is not the American race, that is not even a white race ... The Jews are enemies of the United States." Most shocking was the outbreak of violence between Bund storm troopers and thousands of angry protesters in the streets. During Kuhn's speech, a Jewish protester, Isadore Greenbaum, rushed the stage and had to be rescued by police after he was beaten and stripped by storm troopers.

Criminal conviction 
Later in 1939, seeking to cripple the Bund, New York City Mayor Fiorello La Guardia ordered the city to investigate the Bund's taxes. It found that Kuhn had embezzled over $14,000 from the organization, spending part of the money on a mistress.  District Attorney Thomas E. Dewey issued an indictment and won a conviction against Kuhn. On December 5, 1939, Kuhn was sentenced to two and a half to five years in prison for tax evasion and embezzlement. Despite his criminal conviction for embezzlement, followers of the Bund continued to hold Kuhn in high regard, in line with the Nazi Führerprinzip, which gives the leader absolute power.

Imprisonment and deportation 
Kuhn's citizenship was revoked on June 1, 1943 while he was in Sing Sing prison, on grounds of it having been obtained fraudulently as shown by his ongoing activity as a foreign agent of, and person with loyalty including oaths of military service towards, Germany and the Nazi Party. Upon his release after spending 43 months in prison, Kuhn was re-arrested on June 21, 1943 as an enemy agent and interned by the federal government at a camp in Crystal City, Texas. After the war, Kuhn was sent to Ellis Island and deported to Germany on September 15, 1945. Upon his arrival in Germany, he wanted to return to the United States, but worked as a free man for more than two years as an industrial chemist in a small chemical factory in Munich. The German authorities then decided that he could be tried under Germany's de-Nazification laws, and he was imprisoned in July 1947.

Later life 
Held in an internment camp at Dachau, awaiting trial before a Bavarian German denazification court, he escaped on February 4, 1948, but was recaptured on June 15 in the French zone town of Bernkastel, near Trier. He had been sentenced to 10 years of hard labor, having been found guilty in absentia after a five-hour trial on April 20. The proceeding was "made conspicuous by the absence of not only Kuhn but also of his lawyer and witnesses. The trial was carried out entirely by the presentation of documents which purported to show that Kuhn had close ties with Hitler's Third German Reich and that he had tried to transplant its ideology into the United States." How Kuhn escaped has never been officially explained, although there was an investigation, and the camp director, Anton Zirngibl, was fired. Kuhn told reporters, 'The door was open so I went through.' Kuhn said on June 17 that he considered the ten-year sentence as a "major Nazi offender" unfair, and that he intended to appeal it.

Kuhn was re-arrested in the French occupation zone in June 1948. In 1949, an appellate court reduced Kuhn's sentence to two years of hard labor. He was released on February 22, 1949. While in prison, Kuhn reportedly sent a message to columnist Walter Winchell, who had helped lead media counterattacks against the Bund back in New York City. It read: "Tell Herr Vinchell, I will lift to piss on his grafe [sic]." (Winchell died in 1972).

Death 
Kuhn died of unknown causes on December 14, 1951, in Munich, Germany. The New York Times obituary said that he died "a poor and obscure chemist, unheralded and unsung".

References

External links

 Talking History Archive - Recording of Fritz Kuhn's speech at the German-American Bund Rally, New York City, Feb. 20, 1939, at the University of Albany
 Fritz Julius Kuhn - Federal Bureau of Investigation (FBI)
 "American Bund: The Failure of American Nazism; The German-American Bund's Attempt to Create an American 'Fifth Column'" Article by Jim Bredemus on Traces.org
 
 

1896 births
1951 deaths
American collaborators with Nazi Germany
American people convicted of fraud
Anti-Masonry
American anti-communists
German American Bund
German anti-communists
German emigrants to the United States
German expatriates in Mexico
German people imprisoned abroad
Nazi propagandists
Nazis from outside Germany
Nazis convicted of crimes
Prisoners and detainees of the United States federal government
Prisoners and detainees of Germany
Recipients of the Iron Cross (1914)
Technical University of Munich alumni
Activists from New York City
Inmates of Sing Sing
Loss of United States citizenship by prior Nazi affiliation